Philipse Manor station is a commuter rail stop on the Metro-North Railroad's Hudson Line, located in  the Philipse Manor area of Sleepy Hollow, New York, United States.

Built around 1910 and opened on January 30, 1911, the Tudorbethan architecture of the station's original has earned it a listing on the National Register of Historic Places as an intact example of an early commuter rail station. It is the only station on the Hudson Line besides Poughkeepsie to be so recognized.

History
Philipse Manor was founded in 1869 by Ida Ray Piste. The construction of the Hudson River Railroad and its later acquisition by the New York Central in the late 19th century opened up the river towns in Westchester County for suburbanization. It became possible for those of sufficient means to live in large houses amid the pastoral and scenic riverside, and accordingly villages like Irvington, Tarrytown and North Tarrytown (today's Sleepy Hollow) began to grow and develop.

Undeveloped areas along the railroad line were soon snapped up by developers who saw the possibilities. In 1900 one, John Brisben Walker, acquired the old Kingsland estate in the north of North Tarrytown and began subdividing it. One of his selling points was the rail access, but this failed to materialize and Walker had to sell the property, now called Philipse Manor in a confused reference to nearby Philipsburg Manor House, and had to sell to William Bell, who was able to complete it. Construction continued and subdivided land was sold under the name Philipse Manor Company. Bell made the rail service possible by building the station and presenting it to the railroad. Train service began on January 30, 1911.

It remained in use throughout the private ownership of the railroad. When the Metropolitan Transportation Authority  assumed passenger commuter operations of the then-bankrupt Penn Central in the early 1970s and passed it along to Metro-North in 1983, it eventually closed the station house in favor of automated ticketing operations, and the main house fell into disrepair. The station has since been reused as the Hudson Valley Writers' Center, which won an award from the Preservation League of New York State for its work on the station in 2005.

, the MTA has been working to extend the platforms to accommodate eight-car trains and improve service and capacity. It is part of a $56 million program focused on all the Rivertowns stations. The agency expects it will be complete by 2010.

Station layout

Station building

The main building (no longer used for rail purposes) is a one-story hip-roofed octagonal structure of rock-faced granite block with stone, stucco and wood trim. It is built into the bluff created when the tracks were  cut, and thus access to them was provided through the basement, through doors which have since been bricked off.

The station's east facade is augmented with two gabled porte-cocheres projecting at oblique angles, each supported by a heavy granite pier. Trapezoidal wings also jut from the narrow sides of the octagon. The loggia across the facade has central round arched opening with a parapet. This does not lead to an entrance, instead backing the fireplace and its corbeled stone chimney. The original roof used slate, but it has been replaced with asphalt shingles.

Inside, the fireplace uses several colors of granite, flanked with original iron radiators. It is complemented by dark oak matchboards over the stucco, laid to simulate paneling and form a dado. Further ornamentation includes a double frieze at ceiling level.

Platform and track configuration
The station has two high-level side platforms, each eight cars long. 

The more modern station subsequently built by the Metropolitan Transportation Authority (MTA) consists of two long concrete, elevated side platforms with dark-green painted steel shelters. Between them are the four tracks of this section of the Hudson Line, all with third rails. The inside tracks carry express trains, and diesel-powered Amtrak and Metro-North trains bound for the non-electrified sections between Croton–Harmon and the northern end of the line at Poughkeepsie, none of which stop at Philipse Manor. An overpass connects the two platforms.

See also
Historic Hudson Valley
National Register of Historic Places listings in northern Westchester County, New York

Notes

References

External links

Philipse Manor Metro-North Station (TheSubwayNut)
 Entrance from Google Maps Street View

Metro-North Railroad stations in New York (state)
Railway stations in the United States opened in 1911
Former New York Central Railroad stations
Tudor Revival architecture in New York (state)
Railway stations on the National Register of Historic Places in New York (state)
National Register of Historic Places in Westchester County, New York
Railway stations in Westchester County, New York
Sleepy Hollow, New York
1911 establishments in New York (state)